WPFJ (1480 AM) is a radio station broadcasting a Gospel format. It is licensed to Franklin, North Carolina, United States. The station is owned by Radio Training Network, Inc.

External links

Moody Radio affiliate stations
Radio stations established in 1980
1980 establishments in North Carolina
PFJ